Dark current spectroscopy is a technique that is used to determine contaminants in silicon.

References 

Silicon
Semiconductor device fabrication